Gangsta Party is the ninth studio album by rapper Daz Dillinger. It was released independently on High Powered Music and is Dillinger's only album on this label. The album peaked at number 82 on the Top R&B/Hip-Hop Albums Chart.

Track listing

Charts

References

2007 albums
Daz Dillinger albums